Kochyovsky District (Köćlador rajon) is an administrative district (raion) of Komi-Permyak Okrug of Perm Krai, Russia; one of the thirty-three in the krai. Municipally, it is incorporated as Kochyovsky Municipal District. It is located in the northwest of the krai. Its administrative center is the rural locality (a selo) of Kochyovo. Population:  The population of Kochyovo accounts for 31.4% of the district's total population.

Geography
About 85% of the district's territory is covered by forests.

History
The district was established on September 15, 1926.

Demographics
Ethnic composition (as of the 2002 Census):
Komi-Permyak people: 80.1%
Russians: 18.1%

Economy
The economy of the district is based on forestry, timber industry, and agriculture.

References

Notes

Sources

Districts of Perm Krai
Komi-Permyak Okrug
States and territories established in 1926